Gosford Park Original Motion Picture Soundtrack is the soundtrack to the 2001 film Gosford Park.

Production
The director of Gosford Park, Robert Altman, discussed the direction the film's soundtrack would take with composer, Patrick Doyle, suggesting that the soundtrack should not attempt to direct the audience to any particular part of the film, but to support it nonetheless. Another potential issue in the soundtrack's composition was the integration of Ivor Novello songs with the overall score. Altman noted that both of these aspects were handled well by the composer. Doyle used the film's main character, Mary, as a focal point for his composition, taking influences from her Scottish nationality and incorporating them into the score. He described the collaboration with Altman as "one of the happiest of my career."

Critical response
The film review website SoundtrackNet reviewed the soundtrack positively. The critic, Glenn McClanan, praises Doyle's scoring as "effective and surprisingly well-developed." He goes on to say that the score was intended mainly for two purposes: to give the audience a sense of the film's setting and to impart to the audience a sense of emotion, and that the film is successful in both endeavours.

Track listing

References

Patrick Doyle soundtracks
Comedy film soundtracks
2002 soundtrack albums